Haldor Erickson Boen (January 1, 1851 – July 20, 1912) was an American congressman from Minnesota.

Biography
Boen was born in Sør-Aurdal, Valdres, a traditional district in Oppland county, Norway. He immigrated to the United States in 1868 and settled in Mower County, Minnesota. He attended the St. Cloud Normal School in 1869 and 1870. Boen relocated to Fergus Falls in Otter Tail County in 1871. In 1872, he was employed in the county auditor's office, computing the first taxes levied in Otter Tail County. He taught in public schools of that county from 1874 to 1879. Boen acted as justice of the peace from 1875 to 1900. In 1880, he was elected county commissioner and was a register of deeds from 1888 to 1892.

In November 1892, Boen was elected as a Populist to the 53rd congress, representing the newly created 7th congressional district from March 4, 1893, to March 3, 1895. He was unsuccessful in his re-election bid in 1894. Boen then became editor of the Fergus Falls Globe and resumed agricultural pursuits in Otter Tail County.

He died in Aurdal Township in Otter Tail County and was interred in Aurdal Cemetery near Fergus Falls, Minnesota.

References

Other sources
Minnesota Historical Society. Guide to Research Collections

1851 births
1912 deaths
People from Sør-Aurdal
Norwegian emigrants to the United States
People's Party members of the United States House of Representatives from Minnesota
Minnesota Populists
County commissioners in Minnesota
People from Fergus Falls, Minnesota
St. Cloud State University alumni
19th-century American politicians
American newspaper editors
American justices of the peace
Educators from Minnesota
19th-century American judges
Members of the United States House of Representatives from Minnesota